The International University of Erbil (Arabic: جامعة اربيل الدولية) is an educational institution in Erbil, the flourishing capital of the Kurdistan Region, Iraq. It was established in 2009 after being restructured and named into a new entity. The university has a former name called Sabis University founded in 2007. The university obtained full accreditation (Letter no. 6171 dated on 30 August 2017) from the Iraqi Ministry of Higher Education and Scientific Research In Baghdad

Departments

Engineering, Business and Management

Engineering 
 civil engineering Department
 Department of Computer and Communications Engineering
 Department of Electrical Engineering
 Mechanical Engineering Department

Business and Management 
 Department of General Administration
 Department of Accounting
 Department of Management Information Systems
 Marketing department
 Banking and Financial Services Department
 Tourism and Hospitality Department

Sciences 
 Biology section
 chemistry department
 physics department
 Department of Mathematics and Information Technology
 Department of Mathematics and Science

International Studies and Diplomacy

English departments

Early Childhood Education Department

References 

 Recognition by the Ministry of Higher Education and Scientific Research in the official website  (in Arabic)

External links 
 Website
 In News

Universities in Iraq
2009 establishments in Iraq
Erbil